Willy Decker (born 1950) is a German theatre director, particularly known for his opera productions. He staged the world premieres of Hans Werner Henze's Pollicino (Montepulciano, 1980), Antonio Bibalo's Macbeth (Oslo, 1990), and Aribert Reimann's Das Schloss (The Castle) (Berlin, 1992).

Decker was born in Pulheim near Cologne. He was educated first at the Rheinischen Musikschule in Cologne where he studied violin; later, he attended the University of Cologne and the Hochschule für Musik Köln where he studied philosophy, theatre, music, and singing.  In his early 20s he started work as an assistant director in Essen at the Cologne State Opera, where he eventually served as the artistic director. He went on to direct many new opera productions for major European opera houses, as well as for San Francisco Opera and Lyric Opera of Chicago. He made his Salzburg Festival debut in 2004 directing Korngold's Die tote Stadt; he returned in 2005 for an acclaimed new production of La traviata starring Anna Netrebko and Rolando Villazón.

In 2005, he was appointed an honorary professor in musical theatre direction at the Hochschule für Musik Hanns Eisler in Berlin. As of 2009, he is the artistic director of the Ruhrtriennale Festival.

In 2010, he presents Wagner's Flying Dutchman at the parisian Bastille Opera, and "Tristan und Isolde" in Hong Kong.

References
Cummings, David Cummings, "Decker, Willy", International Who's who in Music and Musicians' Directory (Classical and Light Classical), 17th edition,  Routledge, 2000, p. 150. 
Klinger, Thomas, "Stage director Willy Decker makes his debut in Salzburg", Freunde der Salzburger Festspiele Magazine, April 2004.
Lash, Larry L., Moses und Aron, Wiener Staatsoper, 6/15/06, Opera News, September  2006, vol. 71, no. 3
Salzburger Nachrichten, Standing Ovations für "La Traviata" in Salzburg, 8 August 2005.

External links
Willy Decker at the Ruhrtriennale Festival official web site.

1950 births
Living people
German opera directors
Hochschule für Musik und Tanz Köln alumni
Academic staff of the Hochschule für Musik Hanns Eisler Berlin